19th Lux Style Awards

Date: 
31 December 2020
 
Host:

Director:

Venue: 

Best TV Play:
Meray Paas Tum Ho

Best Film:
Laal Kabootar

←18th Lux Style Awards  20th→
The 19th Lux Style Awards presented by Lux to honor the best in fashion, music, films and Pakistani television of 2019, held digitally on 31 December 2020. The awards were held virtually due to the outbreak of the COVID-19 pandemic in the world.

The ceremony was directed by Feriha Altaf. The ceremony was hosted by Ahmed Ali Butt and Mehwish Hayat. Ranjha Ranjha Kardi remained the most awarded television series while Laal Kabootar remained the most awarded film.

 18th Lux Style Awards

Winners and nominees 
The nominations were announced on 3 October 2020.

Films

Television

Criticism 
Despite winning for Best Director, Best Actor, Best Actress, Best Writer and Best OST Ranjha Ranjha Kardi did not win Best TV Play because it was an audience voted category.

Special

Life time achievement award
 Anwar Maqsood
 Tapu Javeri

References 

Lux Style Awards ceremonies
2020 film awards
2020 television awards
2020 music awards
2020 in Pakistani cinema
2020 in Pakistani television
December 2020 events in Pakistan